The Guatemalan Olympic Committee (abbreviated as COG) is a non-profit organization serving as the National Olympic Committee of Guatemala and a part of the International Olympic Committee and PASO. It was formed in 1947 and recognized by the IOC that same year. As of 2022, COG is officially suspended by IOC.

Suspension
On 15 October 2022 International Olympic Committee officially suspended National Olympic Committee of Guatemala. As a result of suspension, any athletes of Guatemala can no longer represent the country and compete under the country’s flag/name at the Olympic Games and other international multi-sports events as well as Guatemalan NOC lost all the funding from IOC.

Presidents

Executive committee
The committee of the Guatemalan Olympic Committee is represented by:
 President: Gerardo Rene Aguirre Oestmann
 Vice Presidents: Juan Carlos Sagastume
 IOC Member: Willi Kaltschmitt Luján 
 Members: Lorena Toriello, Claudia Rivera, Rafael Cuestas

See also
 :Category:Olympic competitors for Guatemala
 Guatemala at the Olympics
 Guatemala at the Paralympics

References

External links
Official website 

National Olympic Committees
Sports governing bodies in Guatemala
 
Sports organizations established in 1947
1947 establishments in Guatemala